"Top Off" is a song recorded by American record producer DJ Khaled featuring American rappers Jay-Z and Future and American singer Beyoncé (credited as "B"). The artists wrote the song with Joe Zarrillo who produced it with Khaled and Beyoncé. It was released on March 2, 2018, as the lead single from Khaled's eleventh studio album, Father of Asahd. Complex magazine ranked Beyoncé's verse on the song as the second best on the album.

Release and promotion
On February 28, 2018, DJ Khaled announced that he would reveal the title of his upcoming album and release its lead single on March 1, 2018. Prior to the release, Khaled posted a video of him playing the song for comedian Kevin Hart, who reacted by saying: "The world flatlined."

Critical reception
"Top Off" received mixed reviews from critics. According to Billboards Gil Kaufman, "Top Off" is "a breathless outlaw track about outrunning the police and enjoying the finer things". Jon Caramanica of The New York Times disliked Future's verse, writing: "Once you swipe away the numbing hook and pseudo-verse from Future, there, plain as day, is an impressive Jay-Z/Beyoncé duet." Larry Fitzmaurice of Pitchfork gave a negative review of the song, writing that it is "more bland than it is bizarrely successful, proof that Khaled's blockbuster-stuffed style often suffocates under the heft of its own bravado". He opined that the artists' personalities "are simply too distinct at this point to produce something compelling when shoved together on the same track". Pat King of Metro named it "one of the catchiest songs in recent memory about outrunning the cops". Adreon Patterson of Paste felt that "the track is a little underwhelming considering the collaborators' musical status". Serving as a follow-up to "Shining" and "I Got the Keys", he found the song "disappointing and anti-climactic". Tom Breihan of Stereogum praised Khaled for making the song sounds like both a "fame-flexing celebrity event" and an "actual song". Lauren O'Neill of Noisey complimented Beyoncé's ability "to knock every other rapper out of the park with her skill and flow". Bianca Gracie of Fuse declared that the song lacks innovation and fails to be memorable. "Jay-Z and Beyoncé deserve a harder beat underneath their flows; the juvenile SoundCloud production didn't do them any favors especially on Beyoncé's opening part." Following the release of Father of Asahd, Frazier Tharpe of Complex magazine ranked the features on the album, with Beyoncé's verse on "Top Off" coming in 2nd, behind Nipsey Hussle's verse on "Higher". Tharpe commented that "if  there's any benefit to keeping this old dog of a song on the album, it's giving this blackout verse from B a proper home".

Credits and personnel
Credits adapted from Tidal.

Performers
 DJ Khaled – composition, production, vocals
 Jay-Z – composition, vocals
 Future – composition, vocals
 Beyoncé – composition, production, vocals

Additional musician
 Joe Zarrillo – composition, production

Technical
 Manny Marroquin – mix engineering
 Chris Athens – master engineering
 Chris Galland – engineering
 Robin Florent – engineering assistance
 Scott Desmarais – engineering assistance
 Juan Peña – record engineering
 Young Guru – record engineering

Charts

Certifications

Release history

Notes

References

External links
 

2018 songs
2018 singles
Epic Records singles
DJ Khaled songs
Jay-Z songs
Future (rapper) songs
Beyoncé songs
Songs written by DJ Khaled
Songs written by Jay-Z
Songs written by Future (rapper)
Songs written by Beyoncé
Song recordings produced by Beyoncé